Chicken Fat is the debut album by American blues guitarist Mel Brown recorded in 1967 for the Impulse! label.

Reception
The Allmusic review by Sean Westergaard awarded the album 4 stars stating "Guitarist Mel Brown is hailed as "An Impulse! Discovery" on Chicken Fat, his debut for the label, and this album does feature a fantastic unique sound... Leave it to Impulse! to put a new spin on the guitar/organ sound. This is hot stuff".

Track listing
All compositions by Mel Brown, except as indicated
 "Chicken Fat" - 4:16 
 "Greasy Spoon" (Mel Brown, Herb Ellis, Paul Humphrey) - 5:53 
 "Home James" - 6:34 
 "Slalom" (Jules Chaikin) - 2:31 
 "Hobo Flats" (Oliver Nelson) - 2:18 
 "Shanty" (Brown, Arthur Wright) - 4:40 
 "Sad But True" (Ellis) - 5:01 
 "I'm Goin' to Jackson" (Ellis) - 4:24 
 "Blues for Big Bob" - 4:25 
Recorded in Hollywood, California on May 31, 1967 (tracks 1-3, 7 & 8) and June 1, 1967 (tracks 4-6 & 9)

Personnel
Mel Brown - guitar
Herb Ellis (tracks 1-3, 7 & 8), Arthur Wright (tracks 4-6 & 9) - guitar  
Gerald Wiggins - organ (tracks 1, 3-7 & 9)
Ronald Brown - bass 
Paul Humphrey - drums (tracks 1-4, 7 & 8)
Oliver Nelson - arranger (tracks 4-6 & 9)

References

Impulse! Records albums
Albums arranged by Oliver Nelson
Albums produced by Bob Thiele
Mel Brown (guitarist) albums
1967 debut albums